Director of the Military Intelligence Bureau is the head of the Military Intelligence Bureau, which is a Taiwanese intelligence agency.

Military Intelligence Bureau directors (1985-present)

Ref

See also 
 United States
 Director of the Federal Bureau of Investigation
 Director of the Central Intelligence Agency
 Director of the Defense Intelligence Agency
 Hong Kong
 Commissioner of Police

External links 
, AP News. 

Military Intelligence Bureau
Military Intelligence Bureau
Military Intelligence Bureau